The 1937 New Mexico Lobos football team represented the University of New Mexico as a member of the Border Conference during the 1937 college football season. In their first season under head coach Ted Shipkey, the Lobos compiled an overall record of 4–4–1 record with a mark of 2–3–1 against conference opponents, finished fourth in the Border Conference, and were outscored by opponents by a total of 93 to 69. William Murphy was the team captain.

Schedule

References

New Mexico
New Mexico Lobos football seasons
New Mexico Lobos football